John Tribe (December 4, 1841 – December 4, 1917) was a Union Army soldier in the American Civil War who received the U.S. military's highest decoration, the Medal of Honor.

Tribe was born in Tioga County, New York in 1836 and entered service in Oswego. He was awarded the Medal of Honor, for extraordinary heroism shown on August 25, 1862, while serving as a Private with Company G, 5th New York Cavalry, at Waterloo Bridge in Virginia. Tribe won his medal for participating in the destruction of the bridge. His Medal of Honor was issued on June 11, 1895.

Tribe died on his 81st birthday, on December 4, 1917, and was buried at Halsey Valley Cemetery in Tioga County, New York.

Medal of Honor citation

References

External links
 

1841 births
1917 deaths
American Civil War recipients of the Medal of Honor
People from Tioga County, New York
People of New York (state) in the American Civil War
Union Army soldiers
United States Army Medal of Honor recipients